Paul V. Scura was the former Executive Vice President and Head of the Investment Bank of Prudential Securities, a subsidiary of Prudential Financial, from 1986 to 2000. He was responsible for the firm's efforts in the areas of Mergers and Acquisitions, Restructuring and Reorganization, Private Finance, High Yield Finance and all International and US Investment Banking. Paul Scura also sat on the Business Review Committee (the firm's investment banking screening committee) and was a member of the firm's Operating Council. He was a voting member of the Investment Committee of four separate private equity funds and Prudential Securities merchant banking fund, Prudential-Bache Interfunding. In February 1998, he joint ventured with the former EMI/Capitol Music chairman Charles Koppelman for musicians to cash in on music royalties.

Biography
Paul Scura received an A.B. degree in Economics from Villanova University and an M.B.A. degree in Finance from the Wharton School of the University of Pennsylvania.

Mr. Scura is a trustee of the Seton Hall Preparatory School, and sat on the Business Schools Advisory Board at Villanova University. Paul Scura began his professional career with J.P. Morgan & Co. in 1975 where he spent 11 years in both New York and London.  Paul Scura is the Co-Founder along with former Governor James Florio and Keith D. Sernick, former Deputy Treasurer of Nassau County, NY of Xspand, Inc., a consulting and applications software provider, which was acquired by Bear Stearns in 2006.

He currently is Managing Director of Dornoch Holdings, LLC, a real estate and development company which invests in special situation real estate opportunities. In 2001, he founded Scura Partners Securities LLC, a boutique investment bank in New York City.

He currently is the Non-executive Chairman of Private Club Links, LLC.

Has a grandson Gael Scura Rodriguez that goes to Seton Hall Preparatory School.

See also
Business magnate
Entrepreneur
Financier
Industrialist
Gender-neutral language

External links
Prudential Set to Buy Vector.
Behind Tyco's Accounting Alchemy
Prudential Securities Hires NYC Economic Development Corporation President Charles Millard.
Ball’s back on the Street, unscathed by old scandals.
Strike up the Bonds
Pru's New Net Team Rolls With bamboo.com Offering 
Prudential Securities Launches Internet Group; Group headquartered in NYC and Palo Alto
Ex-Gov. Florio's Firm Sold to Bear Stearns
Dornoch Holdings Forms Second Real Estate Fund
Scura Partners Securities LLC

References

American financiers
Villanova University alumni
Wharton School of the University of Pennsylvania alumni
Living people
Year of birth missing (living people)